Yang Se-young (born May 23, 1977) is a South Korean male curler and curling coach.

Teams

Record as a coach of national teams

References

External links

Living people
1977 births
South Korean male curlers
Curlers at the 2007 Asian Winter Games
Medalists at the 2007 Asian Winter Games
Asian Games medalists in curling
South Korean curling coaches
Asian Games gold medalists for South Korea
21st-century South Korean people